Ia Trok is a rural commune of Ia Pa District, Gia Lai Province, Vietnam.

References

Populated places in Gia Lai province
Communes of Gia Lai province